Perkins is a city in southern Payne County, Oklahoma, United States. The population was 2,831 at the 2010 census, an increase of 24.6 percent from the figure of 2,272 in 2000.  The name is derived from Walden Perkins, a congressman who helped establish the local post office. The Iowa Tribe of Oklahoma is headquartered here.

History

Perkins was founded during the Land Run in April 1889. Joseph Wert staked a claim for 160 acres and offered up 40 acres of his land to be established as a township. The town went through three names in its first year- Cimarron, Italy, and then Perkins. The last name was for Bishop Walden Perkins, a congressman from Kansas who pulled strings to establish the post office for the new township. The town of Perkins incorporated on August 25, 1891.

Though Perkins was settled in 1889, it celebrates Old Settlers Day around Sept 22.  This is the anniversary of the Land Run of 1891.  Being on the north side of the Cimarron River, it was one of the starting points for the Run of 1891.   

The first wagon bridge across the Cimarron River was built during the summer of 1891. On September 22, 1891, the Sac and Fox and Iowa reservations officially opened. By January 1900, the Eastern Oklahoma Railway began service, establishing the town as an agricultural trade center.

Geography
It is on the north bank of the Cimarron River. Perkins is located on U.S. Route 177, south of its junction with State Highway 33.

Demographics

As of the census of 2000, there were 2,272 people, 913 households, and 644 families residing in the town. The population density was 1,018.4 people per square mile (393.4/km2). There were 988 housing units at an average density of 442.8 per square mile (171.1/km2). The racial makeup of the town was 85.48% White, 2.46% African American, 6.47% Native American, 0.31% Asian, 0.44% from other races, and 4.84% from two or more races. Hispanic or Latino of any race were 1.10% of the population.

There were 913 households, out of which 32.9% had children under the age of 18 living with them, 54.2% were married couples living together, 13.6% had a female householder with no husband present, and 29.4% were non-families. 27.1% of all households were made up of individuals, and 10.2% had someone living alone who was 65 years of age or older. The average household size was 2.49 and the average family size was 3.02.

In the town the population was spread out, with 27.2% under the age of 18, 9.2% from 18 to 24, 28.8% from 25 to 44, 20.8% from 45 to 64, and 14.0% who were 65 years of age or older. The median age was 35 years. For every 100 females, there were 91.6 males. For every 100 females age 18 and over, there were 81.5 males.

The median income for a household in the town was $30,030, and the median income for a family was $38,580. Males had a median income of $26,553 versus $20,761 for females. The per capita income for the town was $14,955. About 7.6% of families and 11.2% of the population were below the poverty line, including 12.8% of those under age 18 and 12.5% of those age 65 or over.

Government
Perkins has a commission-manager form of government.

Notable people
Jesse Barnes, was a pitcher for the World Series Champion New York Giants.
Frank "Pistol Pete" Eaton is buried in Perkins. The house he lived in is located in the Park located on 177 north of Perkins.
Jeremy Hefner, is a former professional baseball pitcher and pitching coach for the New York Mets.
Linda Livingstone is the 15th president of Baylor University.

Media
Perkins, Oklahoma has been featured in an Independent Lens series documenting bullying.

References

External links
 

Cities in Payne County, Oklahoma
Cities in Oklahoma
Populated places established in 1891
1891 establishments in Oklahoma Territory